Erwin Lehn (8 June 1919, Grünstadt – 20 March 2010) was a German jazz composer, bandleader and musician. On 1 April 1951 he established the Südfunk dance orchestra of the South German Radio in Stuttgart, which he directed until 1992. With the start of a new public broadcasting corporation, the Südwestrundfunk, the name of the "Südfunk Tanzorchester" was changed to "SWR Big Band".

Discography
1966: Musicals on Parade (MPS)
1968: Beat Flames (MPS)
1973: Color in Jazz  (MPS)

External links 
 

1919 births
2010 deaths
People from Bad Dürkheim (district)
German jazz composers
Male jazz composers
German conductors (music)
German male conductors (music)
German jazz bandleaders
People from the Palatinate (region)
20th-century German male musicians
20th-century German musicians